Nowshera, (in Punjabi and ),  is a city and Tehsil (administrative subdivisions) of Khushab District in the Punjab Province of Pakistan. It is the main town (Heart) of Soon Valley. It is also an area of ancient civilization, natural resources, and fertile farms. The general height of surrounding hills is around 2,500 feet above sea level, with several peaks reaching over 3,000 feet.

People

Awan are the major people inhabiting Naushera. H.A. Rose writes, "But in the best available account of the tribe, the Awans are indeed said to be of Arabian origin and descendants of Qutb Shah." Sir Lepel H. Griffin writes in his book The Panjab Chiefs (1865 Edition) that:
 The head of the tribe or village in the Soon valley was known as Raees-Azam. The last Raees-Azam of Naushera was Qazi Mazhar Qayyum. With the growth of industrialization in the country and lack of development programs in the area and migration of people of Naushera towards big cities of the country and even  foreign countries, the tribal solidarity is becoming weak. The process of industrialisation has been rapidly destroying the age-old customs and traditions of this ancient tribe and patriarchal society. The other sub branches and small tribes of Naushera are  Latifal, Jurwal, Radhnal, Sheraal.

Culture

The Majority of the Population speaks Punjabi here. Being a tribe of Arab origin, the local people follows Islamic culture and traditions. Unlike the other parts of Punjab where most people, follow the Indian form of the marriage ceremony, the marriages in Naushera are still arranged according to Islamic traditions and the wedding ceremony usually takes place at the mosques. Nikah is attended by close family members, relatives, and friends of groom and bride. Usually, the men and women are made to sit separately, in different rooms, or have a purdah (curtain) separating them. Luddi ,a traditional Punjabi dance  is famous folk dance on occasions of happiness. Also dhol and shehnai are famous musical instruments for celebrations.

Martial race
In 1849 British took over the administration of Punjab and created Durand Line in 1893 making the area part of British India; earlier the area was part of Afghanistan. 
With the advent of the British Raj a new profession was opened for the local people. The Awans were classified to be "martial race". The British recruited army heavily from Naushera for service in the colonial army, and as such, the Awans also formed an important part of the British Indian Army, serving with distinction during World Wars I and II. Of all the Muslim groups recruited by the British, proportionally, the Awans produced the largest number of recruits during the First and Second World Wars. Contemporary historians, namely Professor Ian Talbot and Professor Tan Tai Yong, have written works that cite the Awans (amongst other tribes) as being looked upon as a martial race by not only the British, but neighbouring tribes as well.

Sir Michael O'Dwyer, Lieutenant Governor of the Punjab joined the Indian service as Magistrate, Civil Judge, Superintendent of the Jail, and Treasury Officer. In 1885, he was posted first to Shahpur in Punjab. He wrote about the tribes of Salt Range:

After the Independence of Pakistan, the army of Pakistan also heavily recruited Awans from this area. Awans occupy the highest ranks of the Pakistani Army. The late Lieutenant Colonel Qazi Iqbal Ahmad, late Lieutenant Colonel Qazi Iftikhar Ahmad, late Lieutenant Colonel Qazi Altaf Hussain, Late Major Qazi Zahoor ul Haq,  Retired Major General Qazi Shafiq Ahmad, Major General Tariq Salim Malik and many other senior officers of Pakistan Army belonged to this town.

Qazis of Naushera

Naushera has produced families of qadis, Muslim jurists who used to live in the Mahalla Qazian Wala. The best known qazis of this family were Qazi Kalim Allah, Qazi Mian Muhammad Amjad. Qazi Mian Ahmad, Qazi Mazhar Qayyum, Qazi Manzoor ul Haq, Qazi Zafar Hussain.

Qazi Mian Muhammad Amjad was born of the qadis family of Naushera, Soon Valley. He was a descendant of Ali Ibn Abi Talib, the fourth caliph of Islam from Al-Abbas ibn Ali. He was grand son of Qazi Kalim Allah, the Muslim qadi and jurist of Naushera in the time of Mughal emperors. He was a legal scholar of  the Hanafi school of Islamic law.  During the period of British government, he rendered legal opinions on Islamic laws and Fiqh.

Raees Azam Naushera, Qazi Mazhar Qayyum was the eldest son of Qazi Mian Muhammad Amjad, and was a well-known "Hakeem" (herbal medicine practitioner), of Soon Valley, and was regarded as an authority on this subject in his time. He died in 1952. He was buried in Naushera, Soon Valley

Qazi Manzoor ul Haq, Imam Abu Hanifa of Naushera was the second son of Qazi Mian Muhammad Amjad. He was known as  Imam Abu Hanifa of Naushera. He was a scholar of Islamic law. In the age of British government when  cases were decided according to English law, Muslims consulted him for his legal opinions on Islamic laws. His son Dr. Mazafar ul Haq was the first of those Pakistanis who had a M.B.B.S. degree. He died in 1954 and was buried in Naushera.

Khan Sahib Qazi Zafar Hussain, was the third son of Qazi Mian Muhammad Amjad. In 1945, he was awarded by the title of Khan Sahib by the British Government in recognition of his services. He used his family and political influence to help the people of his area.  He died in 1968. He was buried in Naushera, Soon Valley.

Notes

References

External links
 https://www.facebook.com/Naushera.SoonValley
 http://soonvalley.yolasite.com/
 http://visitorsheaven.com/Soon%20Sakesar.php
http://www.soonvalley.com/
 Google images of Soon Valley]
 Pictures of Soon Valley, from Yahoo Flickr
 Pictures of Soon Valley, from  www.panoramio.com

Hill stations in Pakistan
Khushab District
Valleys of Pakistan
Union councils of Khushab District
Populated places in Khushab District